The 2014–15 season was Ipswich Town's thirteenth consecutive season in The Football League Championship, the second-highest division in the English football league system.  In addition to competing in The Championship, Ipswich Town competed in the League Cup and the FA Cup.

First-team squad

 (Captain)

Left club during season

Under-23 squad

First-team coaching staff

Pre-season

Competitions

Football League Championship

League table

Results summary

Results by round

Matches

August

September

October

November

December

January

February

March

April

May

Playoffs

FA Cup

Football League Cup

Transfers

Transfers in

Loans in

Transfers out

Loans out

Squad statistics
All statistics updated as of end of season

Appearances and goals

|-
! colspan=14 style=background:#dcdcdc; text-align:center| Goalkeepers

|-
! colspan=14 style=background:#dcdcdc; text-align:center| Defenders

|-
! colspan=14 style=background:#dcdcdc; text-align:center| Midfielders

|-
! colspan=14 style=background:#dcdcdc; text-align:center| Forwards

|-
!colspan=14|Players currently out on loan or that have left the club:

|-

Goalscorers

Assists

Clean sheets

Disciplinary record

Starting 11
Considering starts in all competitions

Awards

Player awards

Football League Championship Manager of the Month

Football League Championship Player of the Month

PFA Championship Team of the Year

References

2014–15 Football League Championship by team
2014–15